Trinity Church (also known as Holy Trinity Church Adelaide, is an Australian evangelical Anglican church located at 88 North Terrace in the city of Adelaide, South Australia. Trinity Church has five gatherings at the North Terrace location each Sunday, as well as various other meetings throughout the week.

History

Trinity Church is historically significant in that it contains elements of the earliest surviving Anglican church building in South Australia. Of special note is the William IV window that was brought to Adelaide in 1836.

The land on which the church stands was donated by Pascoe St Leger Grenfell along with 40 acres of country land for a cemetery and "glebe" lands. Pascoe St Leger Grenfell, the holder of a preliminary land order, Raikes Currie and the Reverend Sir Henry Robert Dukinfield of the Society for the Propagation of the Gospel in Foreign Parts (SPG) who held the collective funds and, thirdly, the men to whom they were transferring their powers, namely James Hurtle Fisher, Osmond Gilles and Charles Mann. Fisher was to be resident commissioner in South Australia of the Colonisation Commission, having responsibility independent of the governor for the administration of land in the new colony; Gilles was to be the treasurer and Mann the advocate general or principal legal officer of the colony. Grenfell transferred control over order no. 171 for a town acre and over 40 acres of country land to be selected in conjunction with the town acre, later known as Trinity Gardens. The conveyance did not have to specify that Currie and Dukinfield hand over money and the portable church, but it may be presumed they did so — alternatively they may have entrusted these resources to John Morphett, appointed as SPG's attorney in the colony. The objects of the trust were to use the town acre as a site for "the erection of a church where Divine Service could be celebrated according to the rites and ceremonies of the Church of England". The same acre was also to provide space for a schoolroom and a parsonage and garden for the minister of the church. The country land was to provide six to eight acres for a cemetery and the remainder to be "glebe land", in the familiar phrase of the Church of England, to provide income for the support of the minister.

The church was built in three main stages. It was originally planned that the church would be a prefabricated building imported from England; however, when the prefabricated building arrived from England badly damaged, it was decided instead to build a stone church, Henry J. Moseley the builder.  Governor Hindmarsh laid the foundation stone on 28 January 1838 and the church opened in about August that year, within two years of the settlement of Adelaide (see History of Adelaide). The building quickly became a landmark with its "peaked cap" top tower and the Vulliamy clock. (Benjamin Lewis Vulliamy 1780–1854, was the clockmaker to King William IV and Queen Adelaide.)

In 1844 the church was closed for repairs and the clock was removed for safekeeping. The body of the church was rebuilt and re-roofed and the tower lost its peaked cap. It reopened in August 1845. When Bishop Short arrived in 1847, Holy Trinity assumed many of the functions of a cathedral and was - until other congregations (especially Christ Church, North Adelaide) were established — the place of worship for the governors, many of the colony’s prominent families and the military.

In 1878, there was a proposal to rebuild when some money was subscribed, but this did not take place until the congregation decided in the mid-1880s to completely rebuild the church to a design by the prominent architect Edward John Woods, using the mellow sandstone which eventually weathered to match the original limestone. It was around this time that the present name of "Holy Trinity" became current.

The hall and the rectory are also significant features in the precinct. The hall was built in 1887 using a donation from a parishioner. The original rectory was a prefabricated "Manning" building which arrived in better condition than the church. It was replaced by the present building in 1851 and was the home of seven successive incumbents. It is now used as offices.

The Revd Lance Shilton, later Dean of Sydney, was rector of Holy Trinity from 1957 to 1973.

Ministry
Trinity Church is a large evangelical and conservative Anglican church. Its main campus is adjacent to the University of South Australia (Uni SA), City West campus. Through its involvement with the Australian Fellowship of Evangelical Students on tertiary campuses it also has links to its students at Adelaide University and the Uni SA City campuses. Members of Trinity City Church are also involved in the Church Missionary Society (CMS) and Scripture Union. Trinity has Sunday school for children in primary school, a youth group for high school students, a young adults group, a weekday women's meeting group, a large number of small Bible study groups and various other groups.

Trinity Church is part of the Adelaide diocese and has an increasing number of locally trained staff, particularly trainees through the Ministry Training Strategy and students of the Bible College of South Australia. In 2007 Trinity Church was involved in initiating "Equip", a training program for Evangelical Anglican churches in South Australia. This ceased in 2016.

Trinity Church has planted thirteen daughter churches:

 Trinity Church Aldgate, in the Adelaide Hills
 Trinity Church Brighton, in the Adelaide sea-side suburb of Hove, South Australia
 Trinity Church Modbury, in a suburb of Tea Tree Gully Council, Modbury, South Australia
 Trinity Church Colonel Light Gardens, Colonel Light Gardens, South Australia
 Trinity Church Mount Barker, in the outer regional centre of Mount Barker, South Australia
 Trinity Church Victor Harbor, in Victor Harbor
 Trinity Church Golden Grove, in Golden Grove
 Trinity Church Unley, in Unley
 Trinity Church Woodcroft, in Morphett Vale, South Australia
 Trinity Church Tonsley, in Tonsley, South Australia
 Trinity Church Mile End, in Mile End, South Australia
 Trinity Church Pooraka, in Pooraka, South Australia
 Trinity Church Campbelltown, in Campbelltown, South Australia

Heritage listings

State
The building was listed on the South Australian Heritage Register on 11 September 1986.

National
The building was listed on the now-defunct Register of the National Estate on 21 October 1980. The listing described both the building and its significance as follows:The first church in South Australia.  The original structure built 1838, rebuilt and enlarged 1844-45 rebuilt 1888 (raised tower and extensions E J Woods arch; only the lower parts of the present nave and tower date from 1838 (foundation stone laid 26 January 1838).  The clock was made in 1836 for South Australia by Vulliamy, clockmaker to King William IV. The church includes the William IV Window, supposed to be the earliest window in South Australia, having been brought out in 1836 with the prefabricated structure intended as the first church.

Historically very significant as it contains elements of the earliest surviving ecclesiastical building in South Australia.  The church has been associated with many important events since the first years of colony.  Of special note is the William IV window which was brought to Adelaide in the first year of the colony. Probably the oldest surviving window in South Australia.

References

External links
Official website

Anglican churches in South Australia
Churches in Adelaide
Gothic Revival architecture in Adelaide
Gothic Revival church buildings in Australia
South Australian Heritage Register
South Australian places listed on the defunct Register of the National Estate